Eric "Bobo" Correa (born August 27, 1968) is a percussionist and a member of the bands Beastie Boys, then Cypress Hill and Ritmo Machine. He performed and recorded with the Beastie Boys through the 1990s.

Biography and career
Eric "Bobo" Correa is the son of Latin jazz musician Willie Bobo. He began drumming at the age of four, and made his first public appearance at the age of five, performing on stage with his father.

Correa ended up recording with the Beastie Boys for the albums Ill Communication and Hello Nasty. While on tour with the Beasties, Correa encountered Cypress Hill and joined the group as their percussionist for their world tours, splitting time between both groups.

References

1968 births
Sol Invicto members
Musicians from Los Angeles
American hip hop musicians
Cypress Hill members
Living people
American people of Puerto Rican descent
Nacional Records artists